Fenns is an unincorporated community in Shelby Township, Shelby County, in the U.S. state of Indiana.

History
Fenns once was a station and shipping point on the Pennsylvania Railroad.

A post office was established at Fenns in 1870, and remained in operation until it was discontinued in 1904.

Geography

References

Unincorporated communities in Shelby County, Indiana
Unincorporated communities in Indiana